Lille-Flandres station (French: Gare de Lille-Flandres, Dutch: Rijsel Vlaanderen) is the main railway station of Lille, capital of French Flanders. It is a terminus for SNCF Intercity and regional trains. It opened in 1842 as the Gare de Lille, but was renamed in 1993 when Lille Europe station opened. There is a 500m walking distance between the two stations, which are also adjacent stops on one of the lines of the Lille Metro.

Construction

The station was built by Léonce Reynaud and Sydney Dunnett for the CF du Nord. Construction began in 1869 and ended in 1892. The station front is the old front from Paris' Gare du Nord and was dismantled then reassembled in Lille at the end of the 19th century; an extra storey, as well as a large clock, were added to the original design. Dunnett added the Hôtel des Voyageurs in 1887, and the rooftop in 1892.

Services

The station is served by the following services:

High speed services (TGV) Paris - Lille
High speed services (TGV) Paris - Lille - Tourcoing
Intercity services (NMBS/SNCB) Antwerp - Ghent - Kortrijk - Mouscron - Lille
Intercity services (NMBS/SNCB) Tournai - Lille
Regional services (TER Hauts-de-France) Lille - Douai - Arras - Paris
Regional services (TER Hauts-de-France) Lille - Douai - Cambrai - St-Quentin
Regional services (TER Hauts-de-France) Lille - Douai - Arras - Amiens - Rouen
Regional services (TER Hauts-de-France) Lille - Béthune - Saint-Pol-sur-Ternoise
Regional services (TER Hauts-de-France) Lille - Lens
Regional services (TER Hauts-de-France) Lille - Valenciennes - Maubeuge - Jeumont
Regional services (TER Hauts-de-France) Lille - Valenciennes - Charleville-Mézières
Regional services (TER Hauts-de-France) Lille - Hazebrouck - Dunkerque
Regional services (TER Hauts-de-France) Lille - Hazebrouck - Calais
Local services (TER Hauts-de-France) Lille - Tournai

SNCB/NMBS
SNCB/NMBS Belgian Railways trains also run from here to: Courtrai/Kortrijk for example on Belgian railway line 75.

See also
Lille-Europe station
Euralille

References

External links 

 
 Official website SNCB/NMBS

Transport in Lille
Buildings and structures in Lille
Railway stations in Nord (French department)
Railway stations in France opened in 1848